Mohamed Laqhila (born 3 August 1959) is a French accountant and politician. Since 18 June 2017, he has served as the member of the National Assembly for the 11th district of the Bouches-du-Rhône.

References

1959 births
Living people
People from Rabat-Salé-Kénitra
Moroccan emigrants to France
Democratic Movement (France) politicians
Deputies of the 15th National Assembly of the French Fifth Republic
Deputies of the 16th National Assembly of the French Fifth Republic
Members of Parliament for Bouches-du-Rhône
Aix-Marseille University alumni